San Jose del Monte National Trade School is a public vocational and secondary school in Barangay Fatima V, Area E, San Jose del Monte City, Bulacan, Philippines. The head of the school is Mr. Alex D. Angeles.

References

High schools in Bulacan
Vocational education in the Philippines
Education in San Jose del Monte